Neighborhood Supastarz is the 17th album by rapper, JT the Bigga Figga.  The album was released on August 9, 2005, for Get Low Recordz and was produced by JT the Bigga Figga.  The album featured many of JT the Bigga Figga's discoveries and associates such as The Game, Juvenile, Young Buck, E-40 and Daz Dillinger.

Track listing
"When Shit Get Thick" feat. The Game, Sean T- 3:19 
"Ceo Stacks" feat. Juvenile, Phats Bossi- 4:04 
"Mobb with This"- 2:57 
"Gotta Get It" feat. Young Buck, Juvenile- 3:39 
"Independent Bubble" feat. E-40, Daz Dillinger- 3:00 
"Neighborhood Supastarz" feat. The Game- 2:07 
"Mind on My Money" feat. Tha Gamblaz, Joi Patrice- 3:29 
"Street Warz" feat. Young Noble, Cozmo- 3:57 
"Dangerous Minds" feat. Juvenile, Skip- 4:20 
"Ghetto Slums" feat. C-Bo, Phats Bossi- 4:55 
"Conspiracy" feat. Gucci, Cozmo- 3:41 
"Who Got My Back" feat. Daz Dillinger, Telly Mac- 4:13 
"Just Hustlin'"- 3:50

JT the Bigga Figga albums
2005 compilation albums
Gangsta rap compilation albums